Mehmet Ali Daylak is a Turkish wrestler who participated at the 2010 Summer Youth Olympics in Singapore. He won the bronze medal in the boys' freestyle 54 kg event, defeating Yerzon Hernandez of Colombia in the bronze medal match.

References

External links
 

Wrestlers at the 2010 Summer Youth Olympics
Living people
Place of birth missing (living people)
Year of birth missing (living people)
Turkish male sport wrestlers
21st-century Turkish people